Régis Huby (born 22 June 1969 in Rennes, France) is a French jazz violinist, composer, and arranger.

Biography 
Huby studied classical music at the Conservatory in Rennes with Catherine Luquin, at the Conservatoire National Supérieur de Musique et de Danse de Paris (CNSM) with François Jeanneau, Hervé Sellin, Patrick Moutal and Alain Savouret. During this time he worked with Dominique Pifarély and Louis Sclavis. He played in a duo with Vincent Courtois, in the Living Time Orchestra with George Russell, and founded  the string ensemble Quatuor IXI (recordings with Joachim Kühn: Phrases)  with Irene Lecoq, Guillaume Roy and Alain Grange, and was the musical director and arranger of the project Nuit Américaine by Lambert Wilson. His first recordings in the field of jazz were made in 1994 with Maria Laura Baccarini (All Around).

In the second half of the 1990s, Huby also played with Didier Lockwood/Onztet de Violon Jazz, Luc Le Masne, Riccardo Del Fra, Jean-Charles Capon and Denis Colin. In 1998 he recorded his debut album Le Sentiment des Brutes on which among others Noël Akchoté participated. Since 1999 he has played with the quartet of Yves Rousseau, with which several albums (most recently 2014 Akasha) were published. From the 2000s, he also worked with Denis Badault, Gérard Pansanel, Claude Tchamitchian, Olivier Benoît, and Guillaume Séguron, and in the ensembles Sound of Choice (Album Invisible Correspondance, with Fredrik Lundin, Guillaume Roy, and Hasse Poulsen among others). He was also a member of the  Orchestre National de Jazz under the direction of Paolo Damiani for the production Charmeditéranéen (ECM 2002, with Anouar Brahem and Gianluigi Trovesi). In jazz, he was involved in 22 recording sessions between 1994 and 2011.

Since the 1990s he has worked as a musician, arranger, and composer on numerous music theater projects and festivals in cooperation with Philippe Destrem, François Raulin, Philippe Deschepper and Ute Lemper. In 2013 he appeared in a duo with Jean-Marc Foltz at the Münsterland Festival.

Discography (selection)

Solo albums 
 1998: Le Sentiment Des Brutes (Transes Européennes, Buda Musique), with Hervé Villieu, Jean Le Floc'h, Bernard Subert, Vincent Guérin, Régïs Boulard, Noël Akchoté
 2006: Simple Sound (Le Chant du Monde), with Catherine Delaunay, Roland Pinsard, Olivier Benoit, Alain Grange, Bruno Chevillon.

Collaborations 
 1997: Capophonie (CC Production), with Jean-Charles Capon Original Quartet
 2002: Oui Mais (Signature/Radio France, France Musique), with Régis Boulard
 2004: Opus Incertum On C... (émouvance), with Octet De Jean-Pierre Jullian
 2005: Phrasen (Signature), with Quatuor IXI feat. Joachim Kühn
 2005: Too Fast For Techno (Quoi de Neuf Docteur), with Serge Adam
 2010: All Around (Abalone), with Maria Laura Baccarini, Yann Apperry
 2011: Cixircle (Abalone), with Quatuor IXI
 2012: Songs No Songs (Abalone), with H3B (Denis Badault, Tom Arthurs, Sébastien Boisseau)
 2012: Ways Out (Abalone), with Claude Tchamitchian Quartet
 2014: Akasha (Abalone), with Yves Rousseau Quartet
 2015: Temps Suspendus (Abalone), with Quatuor IXI
 2015: Gaber, Io E Le Cose (Abalone), with Maria Laura Baccarini
 2015: Wanderer Septet (Abalone), with Wanderer Septet feat. Yves Rousseau
 2016: Need Eden (émouvance), with Claude Tchamitchian Tentet

References

External links 
 Official website
 Short portrait and discography at Jazz and Beyond
 
 

French music arrangers
Living people
1969 births
Musicians from Rennes
French jazz violinists
French jazz composers
Male jazz composers
21st-century French male violinists
Orchestre National de Jazz members